"I Know" is the debut solo single by American singer-songwriter Philip Bailey, released in 1983 by Columbia Records. The song reached No. 10 on the Billboard Hot Black Singles chart.

Overview
"I Know" was produced by George Duke and composed by Gerard McMahon.

The single's B-side is "The Good Guy's Supposed to Get the Girls". Both "I Know" and "The Good Guy's Supposed to Get the Girls" are from Bailey's 1983 album Continuation.

Critical reception
Paul Willistein of The Morning Call proclaimed that George Duke's "keyboard and synthesizer part turn I Know into the album's best cut".

Personnel
Philip Bailey – lead vocals, backing vocals 
George Duke – piano [acoustic], synthesizer [Prophet V]
Nathan East – bass
James Gadson – drums
Paul Jackson Jr. – guitar

References

1983 songs
1983 debut singles
Columbia Records singles
Philip Bailey songs
Songs written by Gerard McMahon